The Viper is a performance catamaran used for racing; it is a one design within the Formula 16 class. It is recognised as a class by the International Sailing Federation.

In early 2012 International Sailing Federation evaluated vessels for the mixed multihull class at the 2016 Olympic Sailing Regatta. The Viper came second out of seven boats evaluated, losing to the Nacra 17.

See also
 List of multihulls

References

External links
 ISAF Microsite
 Builders Website

Catamarans
Classes of World Sailing